is a retired Japanese volleyball player. She was a member of the Japanese winning teams, at the 1962 World Championships and 1964 Summer Olympics.

References

External links
 Video of the moments of victory and of awarding gold medal in 1964 Tokyo Olympics

1940 births
Living people
Olympic volleyball players of Japan
Volleyball players at the 1964 Summer Olympics
Olympic gold medalists for Japan
Japanese women's volleyball players
Olympic medalists in volleyball
Sportspeople from Tochigi Prefecture
Medalists at the 1964 Summer Olympics
20th-century Japanese women
21st-century Japanese women